Bob Anderson is an American animation director on The Simpsons. He also contributed additional sequence direction on The Simpsons Movie.

After high school, Bob Anderson enrolled at the Joe Kubert School of Cartoon and Graphic Art to pursue an education in animation. Before Bob graduated from The Joe Kubert School, he began his professional career. Hired by Broadcast Arts in New York City, he started work on a variety of commercials.

In 1990, Anderson moved to Los Angeles to work as an assistant director for The Simpsons. In the fifth season, after fourteen episodes as an assistant to Jim Reardon and one episode for Mark Kirkland, he made his directorial debut with the episode "Bart's Inner Child" in 1993.

The Simpsons episodes 
He has directed the following episodes:

References

External links 
Bob Anderson on TheTVDB
 

Living people
American animators
American animated film directors
American television directors
Year of birth missing (living people)